Noginsky District is an administrative and municipal district (raion), one of the thirty-six in Moscow Oblast, Russia. It is located in the east of the oblast. Its administrative center is the town of Noginsk. As of the 2010 Census, the total population of the district was 203,609, with the population of Noginsk accounting for 49.1% of that number.

References

Notes

Sources

Districts of Moscow Oblast